Skawa  is a village on the Skawa river (hence its name), in the administrative district of Gmina Raba Wyżna, within Nowy Targ County, Lesser Poland Voivodeship, in southern Poland.

The village has a population of 4,000.

References

Skawa